NGC 7008 (PK 93+5.2), also known as the Fetus Nebula is a planetary nebula with a diameter of approximately 1 light-year located at a distance of 2800 light years in northern Cygnus. It was discovered by William Herschel in 1787, in Slough, England.  NGC 7008 (H I-192) is included in the Astronomical League's Herschel 400 observing program.

References

External links
 
 
 Cosmic Mystery: NGC 7008 by Dietmar Hager
 NGC 7008 @ DeepSkyPedia
 Astronomy Picture of the day

Planetary nebulae
Cygnus (constellation)
7008